The New Caledonia national rugby union team represents New Caledonia in rugby union. The team has been playing international rugby since the 1960s. All their matches have been against other teams from Oceania.

New Caledonia has competed at the South Pacific Games, winning a silver medal in 1966 before finishing out of the medals at the 1969 games. The team won the gold medal in 1987, defeating Cook Islands in the final in Nouméa, and won gold again at the boycott-affected games in Papeete in 1995 where Tahiti was the only other competing team.

More recently, the team has played for the FORU Oceania Cup. In 2008, their win over fellow Pacific rivals Vanuatu in Nouméa, 32–20, paved their way to the final of the competition, but New Caledonia lost the match to Niue, 5–27.



Record

Overall

See also
 French Rugby Federation
 Comité Régional de Rugby de Nouvelle Calédonie
 Rugby union in New Caledonia

Reference list

External links
 rugby.nc official website (in French)
 Comité de Rugby de Nouvelle-Calédonie on aslagnyrugby.net

Rugby union in New Caledonia
Oceanian national rugby union teams
Rugby union